Tauroscopa notabilis is a moth in the family Crambidae. It was described by Alfred Philpott in 1923. It is endemic to New Zealand.

The wingspan is about 20 mm. The forewings are blackish-fuscous sprinkled with ochreous and white scales. The hindwings are pale fuscous.

References

Crambinae
Moths described in 1923
Moths of New Zealand
Endemic fauna of New Zealand
Endemic moths of New Zealand